Wendy Marjorie Edmond, née Wood (born 27 April 1946) is a former Australian politician. Born in Bundaberg, she was a nuclear medicine technologist before entering politics. She was also a member of Amnesty International and the Wildlife Preservation Society, and had served as president of the Rainsworth Branch of the Labor Party. She married university lecturer David Edmond on 30 December 1972. In 1989, she was elected to the Legislative Assembly of Queensland for Mount Coot-tha. When Labor won government in 1998, she was appointed Minister for Health, and in 2001 was given additional responsibility for Women's Policy. Edmond retired from politics at the 2004 state election.

References

1946 births
Living people
Members of the Queensland Legislative Assembly
Australian Labor Party members of the Parliament of Queensland
21st-century Australian politicians
21st-century Australian women politicians
Women members of the Queensland Legislative Assembly